The Hautes Écoles Sorbonne Arts et Métiers University or HESAM University, located in Paris and in multiple campuses in France, is a center for higher education and research as a group of universities and institutions comprising 11 members and 4 associated institutions.

Members 

 École nationale supérieure des arts et métiers (Arts et Métiers)
 Conservatoire national des arts et métiers (CNAM)
 Centre des études supérieures industrielles (CESI)
 École Boulle
 École Duperré
 École Estienne
 École nationale supérieure des arts appliqués et des métiers d'art (ENSAAMA)
 École nationale supérieure d'architecture de Paris-La Villette (ENSAPLV)
 École nationale supérieure de création industrielle (ENSCI - Les Ateliers)
 Institut Français de la Mode (IFM)
 Paris School of Business (PSB)

Associated institutions 

 Centre de formation des journalistes de Paris (CFJ)
 Fondation Nationale Entreprise et Performance (FNEP)
 France Clusters
 Les Compagnons du Devoir

See also 

 CROUS

References

External links 

 HESAM University

 
Universities and colleges in Paris
Educational institutions established in 2015
2015 establishments in France